Jonathan David Cahn (born 1959) is an American Messianic Jewish minister, author, and novelist known for his debut novel The Harbinger and his prophetic claims about former U.S. President Donald Trump. He is the founder and leader of the Beth Israel Worship Center in Wayne, New Jersey.

Personal life
Born in New York State, Cahn was raised in a Jewish family, the son of a Holocaust refugee, and attended the synagogue frequently. Aged 20, after a near-death experience, he accepted Yeshua as Messiah. He attended SUNY Purchase and studied history. In 1989, Cahn started "Hope of the World Ministries" (HOW), an outreach of the Gospel and compassion projects for the needy and currently is the president of the organization and further publishes Sapphires Magazine and ministers on radio, television, and internet.

Ministry
Cahn is the head of the Beth Israel Worship Center congregation whose "liturgy focuses on Jesus as savior." The group had been located in Garfield, New Jersey throughout the 1990s but moved to Wayne, New Jersey in 2008. Their arrival in Wayne was viewed with suspicion by local leaders of Judaism as "Messianism has been condemned by Jewish clergy and leaders as a cloak for Christian missionizing." With the arrival of Cahn's group, the YM-YWHA of North Jersey held a counter-missionary event with a member of Jews for Judaism. Cahn told reporters that "the congregation has no intention of 'targeting' the Jewish community. However, anybody is welcome at the center."

Cahn has claimed that President Donald Trump's rise to power was prophesied in the Bible. In one of his books, he compares Trump to King Jehu who led ancient Israel away from idolatry. Cahn has said that the United States is "on the wrong path" due to the prevalence of abortion, the pursuit of gay rights, and the perceived decline in the public role of religion.

Books 
Cahn's 2011 debut novel, The Harbinger, compares the United States and the September 11 attacks to ancient Israel and the destruction of the Kingdom of Israel. Cahn has followed The Harbinger with five other books: The Mystery of the Shemitah, The Book of Mysteries, The Paradigm, The Oracle, and The Harbinger II: The Return. The Paradigm debuted at #5 on The New York Times best-seller list. In 2019, The Oracle: Jubilean Mysteries Unveiled, was published. His latest book, published in 2022, is Return of the Gods.

Films 
 The Harbinger Decoded is a documentary film based on the book, featuring Jonathan Cahn.
 The Harbingers of Things to Come is a film calling for the people of the United States to repent and return to God and predicting America’s destruction if they do not.

Bibliography

Books
  The Harbinger (2011)
  The Harbinger Companion: With Study Guide (2013)
  The Mystery of the Shemitah (2014)
  The Book of Mysteries (2016)
  The Paradigm (2017)
  The Oracle: Jubilean Mysteries (2019)
  The Harbinger II: The Return (2020)
  The Return of the Gods (2022)

References

1959 births
Living people
American male writers
Jewish American writers
Messianic clergy
Converts to Christianity from Judaism